Justice Rajeev Sharma (born 8 October 1958) is an Indian Judge. He is former Judge of Punjab and Haryana High Court and Acting Chief Justice of Uttarakhand High Court and also a Judge of Uttarakhand High Court. He is also former Judge of Himachal Pradesh High Court.

References

Indian judges
1958 births
Living people